In conformal geometry,  a conformal Killing vector field  on a manifold of dimension n with  (pseudo) Riemannian metric  (also called a conformal Killing vector, CKV, or conformal colineation), is a vector field  whose (locally defined) flow defines conformal transformations, that is, preserve  up to scale and preserve the conformal structure. Several equivalent formulations, called the conformal Killing equation, exist in terms of the Lie derivative of the flow e.g.  
for some function  on the manifold. For  there are a finite number of solutions, specifying the conformal symmetry of that space, but in two dimensions, there is an infinity of solutions. The name Killing refers to Wilhelm Killing, who first investigated Killing vector fields.

Densitized metric tensor and Conformal Killing vectors
A vector field  is a Killing vector field if and only if its flow preserves the metric tensor  (strictly speaking for each compact subsets of the manifold, the flow need only be defined for finite time). Formulated mathematically,  is Killing if and only if it satisfies 

where  is the Lie derivative. 

Note that a Killing vector field preserves  and so automatically also satisfies this more general equation. Also note that  is the unique weight that makes the combination  invariant under scaling of the metric. Therefore, in this case, the condition depends only on the conformal structure. 
Now  is a w-Killing vector field if and only if 

Since  this is equivalent to
 
Taking traces of both sides, we conclude .

Equivalent formulations
The following are equivalent
  is a conformal Killing vector field,
 The (locally defined) flow of  preserves the conformal structure,
 
 
  for some function 
The discussion above proves the equivalence of all but the seemingly more general last form. 
However, the last two forms are also equivalent: taking traces shows that necessarily .

The last form makes it clear that any Killing vector is also a conformal Killing vector, with

The conformal Killing equation

Another index notation to write the conformal Killing equations is

Examples

Flat space
In -dimensional flat space, that is Euclidean space or pseudo-Euclidean space, there exist globally flat coordinates in which we have a constant metric  where in space with signature , we have components . In these coordinates, the connection components vanish, so the covariant derivative is the coordinate derivative. The conformal Killing equation in flat space is

The solutions to the flat space conformal Killing equation includes the solutions to the flat space Killing equation discussed in the article on Killing vector fields. These generate the Poincaré group of isometries of flat space. Then  is symmetric.

From the general solution there are  more generators, known as special conformal transformations, given by

The conformal Killing equation gives

We now project  into two independent tensors: a traceless and pure trace part over its first two indices. The traceless part  satisfies the regular Killing equation, showing  is antisymmetric on the first two indices. It is symmetric on the second two indices. This shows that under a cyclic permutation of indices,  picks up a minus sign. After three cyclic permutations, we learn .

Higher order terms vanish (to be completed)

Together, the  translations,  Lorentz transformations,  dilatation and  special conformal transformations comprise the conformal algebra, which generate the conformal group of pseudo-Euclidean space.

See also
 Affine vector field
 Curvature collineation
 Einstein manifold
 Homothetic vector field
 Invariant differential operator
 Killing vector field
 Matter collineation
 Spacetime symmetries

References
 Wald, R. M. (1984). General Relativity. The University of Chicago Press.

Differential geometry
Mathematical methods in general relativity